Snježana Kordić (born 29 October 1964) is a Croatian linguist. In addition to her work in syntax, she has written on sociolinguistics. Kordić is known among non-specialists for numerous articles against the puristic and prescriptive language policy in Croatia. Her 2010 book on language and nationalism popularises the theory of pluricentric languages in the Balkans.

Biography

Education
Snježana Kordić obtained a degree from Osijek University (1988) and an M.Sci. in Linguistics from the Faculty of Philosophy at the Zagreb University (1992).
She earned her Ph.D. in Zagreb (1993). In Germany she obtained a habilitation in Slavic philology (qualification at professorship level) from the University of Münster in 2002.

Academic appointments
Kordić taught and conducted research at a number of Croatian and German universities. From 1990 to 1991 she was an assistant at the Osijek University, and from 1991 to 1995 she was an assistant at the Zagreb University. Then she moved to Germany and was a lecturer at the Bochum University from 1993 to 1998. She later served as an associate professor at the Münster University from 1998 to 2004. After that, she was a visiting professor at the Humboldt University of Berlin from 2004 to 2005. From 2005 to 2007 she was a lecturer at the Frankfurt University.

Works and reception
Snježana Kordić's main focal points in research and teaching are grammar, syntax, text linguistics, textual cohesion, pragmatics, lexicology, corpus linguistics, quantitative linguistics, sociolinguistics and language policy. She has authored over 150 linguistic publications, among which are a textbook, a grammar book, and three monographs, which have been translated into English, German or Spanish. Each of her books on syntactic issues has gotten more positive reviews from around the world than any other linguistic book published in Croatia.

Monograph on relative clauses in Serbo-Croatian (1995)
Her first monograph on relative clauses was well received. Many reviewers commented favourably on it. Ian Press wrote:

Hans-Peter Stoffel underlined:

Monograph on Serbo-Croatian words on the border between lexicon and grammar (2002)
In her second monograph, which has also been reviewed with approval, Snježana Kordić examines Serbo-Croatian words that oscillate between having a full lexical status and a functional grammatical status, a factor that has complicated their lexicographic and grammatical description in dictionaries and grammars. These are mainly lexemes which have a high frequency usage and are used in many different ways. The monograph provides information on the syntax, semantics and pragmatics of the usage of selected pronouns, nouns, particle, conjunctions and verbs.

Matthew Feeney concluded his review by saying: 

Peter Herrity emphasised that:

Wayles Browne, an American expert on relative clauses, commented both of the books. He noted that Kordić's first book on relative clauses is:  In the same review article, Browne pointed out that Kordić's second monograph

Monograph on language and nationalism in Croatia (2010)
Snježana Kordić's third monograph deals with sociolinguistic topics, such as language policy in Croatia, theory of pluricentric languages, and how identity, culture, nation, and history can be misused by politically motivated linguists. Kordić ascertains that since 1990, purism and prescriptivism have been the main features of language policy in Croatia. A ban on certain words perceived as "Serbian" (which were for the most part merely international) and the idea that a word is more "Croatian" if fewer Croats understood it, resulted in the widespread impression that no one but a handful of linguists in Croatia knew the standard language.

With a plethora of quotations from German, French, Polish and English linguistic literature, Kordić demonstrates that the language of Croats, Serbs, Bosniaks and Montenegrins is a polycentric language, with four standard variants spoken in Croatia, Serbia, Montenegro and Bosnia and Herzegovina.

These variants do differ slightly, as is the case with other polycentric languages (English, German, French, Portuguese, and Spanish, among others), but not to a degree which would justify considering them as different languages. This fact suggests by no means a re-establishment of a common state, since standard variants of all other polycentric languages are spoken in different countries, e.g. English in the US, UK, Australia, and Canada, German in Austria, Germany, and Switzerland. The above examples demonstrate that the pluricentricity of language does not imply linguistic unification. Each nation can codify its variant on its own.

Kordić criticizes a romantic view of language and nation, which is very widespread in Croatia. The romantic idea that the nation and the language must match has its roots in 19th century Germany, but by the middle of the 20th century, the scientific community abandoned that idea. She also argues against political interference in linguistics.

As regards the name of the language, Kordić discusses only the name to be used in linguistics, leaving non-linguists to name the language any way they prefer.

The monograph generated significant media coverage. Kordić gave over sixty interviews discussing her book. Some prominent Croatian intellectuals have praised the book. The book also received negative criticism, in both Croatia and Serbia, where Serbian weekly journals opined that the book is "far more dangerous for Serbian linguistics than for Croatian [linguistics]"; it is "destructive for the Serbs" because it "makes the language free from the Serbian tradition, it reduces the language to a symbolic-neutral communication tool, it encourages the indifference towards naming of the language and towards the number of different names given to the Serbian language". In Croatia, a group, Hitrec, tried to file a lawsuit against the then active minister of culture arguing that the state should not sponsor that book. However, the State's Attorney of Zagreb declined to prosecute. The attempt itself to file the lawsuit was criticised as a "witch hunt" in parts of the Croatian media. In 2017, Kordić's book became the inspiration for the Declaration on the Common Language that also attracted media attention.

In his review of the monograph on language and nationalism (Jezik i nacionalizam), Zoran Milutinović commented:

Reviewer Goran Miljan wrote:

Selected publications
See also

Monographs

 
  Contents.
 
 
  
  [1st pub . . . Índice .]

Other books

  [grammar book]
  [1st pub . . . . HathiTrust 004006395. . .] and audiocassette: 65 minutes

Media interviews

In Croatia

 45 minutes.

; 

 Alt URL . 62 minutes.

In Bosnia

 15 minutes.
 Alt URL 5 minutes.

 7 minutes.

 . 25 minutes.
 . 15 minutes.
 . 11 minutes.

 . 8 minutes.

 Alt URL . 53 minutes.
 . 30 minutes.
 . 15 minutes.
 . 12 minutes.

 Alt URL
In Serbia

 40 minutes.
; 

 Alt URL . 30 minutes or transcription.
 7 minutes.

In Montenegro

 Video fragment 10 minutes.

 15 minutes.
 Alt URL

See also

 Ausbausprache
 Cooperative principle
 Croatian Academy of Sciences and Arts
 Deixis
 Demonstrative pronoun
 Descriptive linguistics
 Differences between Serbo-Croatian standard varieties
 Dual
 Existential clause
 Folk linguistics
 Function word
 Grammatical number
 Implicature
 Language policy
 Language secessionism in Serbo-Croatian
 Linguistic prescription
 Mutual intelligibility
 Personal pronoun
 Philosophy of language
 Pluricentric Serbo-Croatian language
 Possessive
 Pro-drop language
 Quantitative linguistics
 Relative pronoun
 Relativizer
 Restrictive clause
 Serbo-Croatian grammar
 Serbo-Croatian language
 Serbo-Croatian phonology
 Serbo-Croatian reflexive pronoun
 Serbo-Croatian relative clauses
 Sociolinguistics
 South Slavic dialect continuum
 South Slavic languages
 Standard language
 Suppletion
 Štokavian
 T–V distinction
 Word order
 Vladimir Anić
 Stjepan Babić
 Dalibor Brozović
 Ranko Bugarski
 Paul Grice
 Bernhard Gröschel
 Senahid Halilović
 Janko Polić Kamov
 Radoslav Katičić
 Heinz Kloss
 August Kovačec
 Predrag Matvejević
 Svein Mønnesland
 Ivo Pranjković
 Matija Antun Reljković
 Michael Schmidt-Salomon
 Dubravko Škiljan
 Mario Vargas Llosa

Explanatory notes

a.  The Durieux-Editor Nenad Popović was honored by the German newspaper Süddeutsche Zeitung as one of the six persons that rendered outstanding services to peace in the world in 2010. The newspaper wrote that Nenad Popović published Snježana Kordić's book Jezik i nacionalizam in 2010. The original text is as follows: "In diesem Jahr machte Popovićs Verlag mit einem Buch der Autorin Snježana Kordić auf dem ganzen Balkan Furore. In ihrem Werk ‘Die Sprache und der Nationalismus’ kommt die in Zagreb und Münster ausgebildete Sprachwissenschaftlerin zum Schluss, dass die südslawischen Völker – Serben, Kroaten, Bosnier und Montenegriner – eine gemeinsame Standardsprache haben. Die Studie war ein Schlag ins Gesicht der Nationalisten, die nach der staatlichen Unabhängigkeit nun versuchen, das Serbokroatische, die Lingua franca der Region, zu begraben und eigene Sprachen zu erfinden."

b.  In Croatia, Jezik i nacionalizam was among the five titles nominated for book of the decade in the field of peacebuilding, nonviolence and human rights.

References

External links

Works by Snježana Kordić at HathiTrust

Works by Snježana Kordić on The LINGUIST List
Works by Snježana Kordić at the Croatian scientific bibliography datebase
Snježana Kordić at the Who is Who in Croatian Science (Ruđer Bošković Institute Library)

Works by Snježana Kordić at Semantic Scholar

Snježana Kordić's 
Snježana Kordić at Publons
Papers and books by Snježana Kordić in the Social Science Research Network (SSRN) (abstracts; full texts)

 (60 minutes) 
 (55 minutes) and a brief interview before the lecture (5 minutes) 

1964 births
Living people
Slavists
Linguists from Croatia
University of Osijek alumni
Faculty of Humanities and Social Sciences, University of Zagreb alumni
Croatian educators
Croatian women educators
Croatian science writers
Academic staff of the University of Osijek
Academic staff of the University of Zagreb
Academic staff of Ruhr University Bochum
Academic staff of the University of Münster
Academic staff of the Humboldt University of Berlin
Academic staff of Goethe University Frankfurt
German women academics
Croatian women academics
Croatian philologists
Education writers
Lecturers
Russian studies scholars
Secular humanists
Critics of postmodernism
Independent scholars
Scholars of nationalism
Croatian pacifists
Croatian Esperantists
Women horticulturists and gardeners
Amateur astronomers
Microscopists
People from Osijek
Croatian expatriates in Germany
Textbook writers
Women textbook writers
Women science writers
Croatian women critics
Freethought writers
Syntacticians
Pragmaticists
Corpus linguists
Discourse analysts
Sociolinguists
Women linguists
20th-century linguists
21st-century linguists
20th-century women scientists
21st-century women scientists
Scientists from Zagreb
Former Roman Catholics
20th-century atheists
21st-century atheists
20th-century Croatian non-fiction writers
21st-century Croatian non-fiction writers
20th-century Croatian scientists
21st-century Croatian scientists
Signatories of the Declaration on the Common Language
Croatian women scientists